Dolauhirion Bridge is a single arch stone bridge which carries road traffic from Llandovery to Cilycwm over the River Towy in Carmarthenshire, Wales. It is a grade I listed structure. At the time the bridge was built the road was the main coach road from Llandovery to Lampeter.

Various wooden bridges had stood at the site until the present stone bridge was built in 1773 by the minister and bridge builder William Edwards. He had built several single arch stone bridges in Wales, particularly at Pontypridd, where he had constructed what was then the biggest single arch in the world. Typical of Edward's designs the bridge has circular openings in the haunches, which relieve stress on the main structure in times of flood, and reduce weight and thus pressure on the arch.

References

Bridges in Carmarthenshire
Grade I listed buildings in Carmarthenshire
Grade I listed bridges in Wales
Bridges over the River Towy
Stone bridges in the United Kingdom
Llandovery